Joseph Mason may refer to:

Sportpeople
 Joe Mason (footballer, born 1991) (born 1991), Irish footballer who currently plays with Cavalry F.C.
 Joe Mason (footballer, born 1940) (1940–2019), Scottish former footballer who played with Rangers F.C. and Greenock Morton F.C.

Politicians
 Joseph Mason (Canadian politician) (1839–1890), merchant and politician in British Columbia, Canada
 Joseph Mason (Illinois politician), member of the Illinois House of Representatives from 1913 to 1917.
 Joseph Mason (New York politician) (1828–1914), U.S. Representative from New York

Others
 Joseph Mason (artist) (1802–1842), American artist and assistant to John James Audubon
 Joseph Mason (settler), early American settler of Colorado
 Joe Mason (aid worker), American Red Cross Field Director during World War II
 Joe L. Mason, colonel in the United States Air Force
 Joseph R. Mason, American economist